The 1990 Minnesota Senate election was held in the U.S. state of Minnesota on November 6, 1990, to elect members to the Senate of the 77th Minnesota Legislature. A primary election was held on September 11, 1990.

The Minnesota Democratic–Farmer–Labor Party (DFL) won a majority of seats, remaining the majority party, followed by the Independent-Republicans of Minnesota. The new Legislature convened on January 8, 1991.

Results

See also
 Minnesota House of Representatives election, 1990
 Minnesota gubernatorial election, 1990

References

1990 Minnesota elections
Minnesota
Minnesota Senate elections